Carl L. Maston (born Carl Mastopietro, June 17, 1915 – May 31, 1992) was an influential Los Angeles mid-century modern architect.



Biography 
Maston was born to an Italian father and English mother.  Ultimately choosing the architectural profession over a career in music, 
Maston designed more than 100 buildings, including private residences,
apartment buildings, shopping centers and large-scale institutional projects.  Upon graduating from the University of Southern California he worked for the offices of Floyd Rible, A. Quincy Jones, Fred Emmons, Phil Daniel, and Allied Architects.
After serving in World War II, Maston returned to Los Angeles and opened his
first office in Beverly Hills. In 1946, he was commissioned to build the Pandora
Apartments, marking the beginning of his experimentation with gardenapartment
design. In 1954, Maston completed his portion of the quintessential
California apartment complex, the National Boulevard Apartments (Maston
designed one building, architect Ray Kappe the other). In 1960, he designed the now demolished Valley Ice Skating Center which featured a barrel vaulted tensile concrete roof. Among his most noted accomplishments are the Cal Poly Pomona College of Environmental Design, and the Creative Arts Building at the
California State University, San Bernardino.

In the 1980s he married Edith Carissimi, who for four decades, ran Musso & Frank Grill, Hollywood's oldest restaurant and celebrity haunt.

Works

Of his residential work, the Thies Residence, the Hillside House, and the Maston Residence have been recently renovated by Glee creator Ryan Murphy and published.  The Cal Poly Pomona College of Environmental Design still stands in almost original condition.  The only modification being a seismic retrofit which added several exposed concrete ties around the brick portions of the building.  The Los Angeles Conservancy noted "With its exposed concrete, brick, and glass, Maston's design expresses itself in a functional yet aesthetically pleasing place for students to practice their craft."

References
 Carl Maston; Architect's Works Dot the Southland Landscape LA Times, June 3, 1992

Architects from California
Modernist architects
USC School of Architecture alumni
1915 births
1992 deaths
20th-century American architects